Henri Bouvier (born 1901, date of death unknown) was a French swimmer. He competed in the men's 200 metre breaststroke event at the 1924 Summer Olympics.

References

External links
 

1901 births
Year of death missing
Olympic swimmers of France
Swimmers at the 1924 Summer Olympics
Place of birth missing
French male breaststroke swimmers